Neil Foyle is an Irish sportsperson.  He plays hurling with the Laois senior inter-county hurling team. On 14 May 2011, he scored 1-1 against Antrim in the 2011 All-Ireland Senior Hurling Championship, starting at full forward in the 1-21 to 3-12 defeat.

References

1991 births
Living people
Laois inter-county hurlers
Borris-in-Ossory hurlers